Prednazoline, a compound of prednisolone phosphate with fenoxazoline, is a synthetic corticosteroid as well as vasoconstrictor and α-adrenergic sympathomimetic.

See also
 Prednazate
 Prednimustine

References

Alpha-adrenergic agonists
Corticosteroid esters
Corticosteroids
Diketones
Glucocorticoids
Imidazolines
Mineralocorticoids
Phosphates
Pregnanes
Sympathomimetics
Triols
Vasoconstrictors